Emmanuel García may refer to:

 Emmanuel García (footballer, born 1989), Mexican midfielder
 Emmanuel García (footballer, born 1993), Argentine midfielder

See also
 Emmanuel Garcia (born 1986), Canadian baseball player
 Emanuel García (born 1990), Argentine midfielder